Pillager Band of Chippewa Indians (or simply the Pillagers;  in the Ojibwe language) are a historical band of Chippewa (Ojibwe) who settled at the headwaters of the Mississippi River in present-day Minnesota. The French called them , also a translation of their name. The French and Americans adopted their autonym for their military activities as the advance guard of the Ojibwe in the invasion of the Dakota country.

History

Names
Their name has been variously recorded as:
 Chippeways of Leech Lake (Lewis and Clark, 1806), English transliteration of French name adopted from other Algonquian-speaking people
  (Henry, 1809), the French name, meaning 'plunderers'
 Rogues (Henry, 1809)
 Pilliers (Franklin, 1824), variation of the French
 Robbers (Franklin, 1824)
 Pillagers (Treaty of Fond du Lac with the United States, 1847)

By the mid-nineteenth century, records showed that scholars and Indian agents were generally using the band's Ojibwe name, although they struggled to render the spelling in the best way to convey pronunciation:
  (Warren, 1852)
  (Warren, 1852)
  (Ramsey, 1852)
  (Schoolcraft, 1852)
  (Schoolcraft, 1852)
  (Schoolcraft, 1855)
  (Schoolcraft, 1855)
 Cypowais plunderers (Beltrami, quoted by Neill, 1858, a combination of French and English terms)
  (Baraga, 1878)
  (William Jones, 1905)

Sub-bands
The Pillagers at the time had several sub-bands, identified by location. These included the following:
 Northern Bands
 Red Cedar (Cass) Lake Band of Chippewa Indians ( - "where there are many red cedar")1
 Turtle Portage Band of Chippewa Indians, located about Turtle River and Turtle Lake, between Leech Lake and Red Lake.2
 Lake Winnibigoshish Band of Chippewa Indians
 Eastern Bands
 Leech Lake Band of Ojibwe 
 Bear Island (on Leech Lake)
 Boy Lake
 Pine Point (on Leech Lake)
 Pillager
 Upper Crow Wing River (literally ″Raven's Wing River Men″)
 Wing River
 Western Bands
 Otter Tail Lake Band of Chippewa Indians
 Otter Tail River

Unification
Through the treaty process with the United States, the Pillager Band were settled on reservations in north-central Minnesota.  A majority were placed on the following three reservations, established under the 1855 Treaty of Washington :
 Cass Lake Reservation
 Lake Winnibigoshish Reservation
 Leech Lake Reservation
Through additional treaties with the United States, the Leech Lake and Lake Winnibigoshish reservations were nearly doubled in size in the late nineteenth century.

When the White Earth Reservation was created in 1867, the western Pillagers living about Otter Tail Lake agreed to relocate to that reservation so they would no longer be landless.

In 1934, the Cass Lake, Lake Winnibigoshish and Leech Lake Pillagers, together with the White Oak Point Reservation of the Mississippi Chippewa and the Removable Lake Superior Chippewa Bands of the Chippewa Reservation, agreed to a merger and re-organization.  Together, these central Minnesota peoples formed today's Leech Lake Band of Ojibwe, consolidated chiefly on the Leech Lake Indian Reservation.

The successors apparent of the Pillagers are:
 Leech Lake Band of Ojibwe
 White Earth Band of Chippewa

In turn, that year the Leech Lake and White Earth bands participated in writing a constitution for a new tribal government.  They were two of six bands that formed the Minnesota Chippewa Tribe for their overall government and services within the area of the state.

References

External links
The 1847 Treaty between the United States and the Pillager Band of Chippewa Indians

Native American tribes in Minnesota
Ojibwe in Minnesota